WINKS Statistical Data Analytics(SDA) & Graphs is a statistical analysis software package.

It was first marketed in 1988 by the company TexaSoft (founded in 1981), named KWIKSTAT. The name WINdows KwikStat was shortened to WINKS when the Windows version was deployed.

WINKS is sold in two editions: the Basic Edition includes data handling and statistical analysis that include basic statistical procedures and the Professional Edition include a number of more advanced procedures.  A special Time Series version of WINKS is available in support of the book Applied Time Series Analysis from CRC Press.

Major statistical Procedures in WINKS 
 Descriptive statistics
 Grubbs outlier test
 t-tests: single, independent, and paired
 Multiple regression, simple, stepwise, polynomial, all-possible
 ANOVA, simple, multi-way with multiple comparisons, 95% CI
 Analysis of covariance
 Repeated measures ANOVA
 Correlation: Pearson, Spearman & Partial
 Mantel–Haenzel
 Non-parametric tests
 Kruskal–Wallis
 Mann–Whitney
 Friedman's test (repeated measures)
 Multiple comparisons on most group comparison tests
 Dunnett's test
 Crosstabulation, chi-square, likelihood ratio
 Goodness-of-fit
 z-scores
 Survival analysis
 Bland–Altman plots
 Inter-rater reliability
 Kappa (weighted)
 Fisher's exact test 2×2 tables
 Cramér's V, phi
 McNemar's, Cochran's Q
 Logistic regression
 Odds ratios
 Sensitivity and specificity
 ROC curves
 Time series analysis
 Statistical and QC charts and graphs
 Forest plots

External links
 

Statistical software
Windows-only software